Silk Hat Kid is a 1935 American crime film directed by H. Bruce Humberstone and written by Edward Eliscu, Lou Breslow and Dore Schary. The film, starring Lew Ayres, Mae Clarke, Paul Kelly, Ralf Harolde, William Harrigan and Billy Lee, was released on July 19, 1935, by 20th Century-Fox Film Corporation.

Plot

Cast 
Lew Ayres as Eddie Howard
Mae Clarke as Laura Grant
Paul Kelly as Tim Martin
Ralf Harolde as Lefty Phillips
William Harrigan as Brother Joe Campbell
Billy Lee as Tommy
John Qualen as Mr. Fossbender
Warren Hymer as Misty
Vince Barnett as Mr. Rabinowitz

References

External links 
 

1935 films
1930s English-language films
Fox Film films
American crime films
1935 crime films
Films directed by H. Bruce Humberstone
American black-and-white films
Films scored by Samuel Kaylin
1930s American films